Elita Kļaviņa (born 3 November 1966) is a Latvian actress and a former journalist. In the theater she has worked for Jaunais Rīgas Teātris. She has also taken part in several films.

Filmography

External links
Elita Kļaviņa at the Jaunais Rīgas Teātris homepage

1966 births
Living people
People from Jēkabpils
Latvian stage actresses
Lielais Kristaps Award winners
20th-century Latvian actresses
21st-century Latvian actresses
Latvian film actresses